Sir John Robert Mowbray, 1st Baronet PC (3 June 1815 – 22 April 1899), known as John Cornish until 1847, was a British Conservative politician and long-serving Member of Parliament, eventually serving as Father of the House.

Family and education
Mowbray was the son of Robert Stirling Cornish and was educated at Westminster School and Christ Church, Oxford. 

In 1847 he married Elizabeth Mowbray, the sole heiress of George Isaac Mowbray of Bishopwearmouth. The same year he assumed by royal licence the surname Mowbray in lieu of his patronymic to reflect the large fortune into which he married. They had three sons, all of whom succeeded to their father's baronetcy, and two daughters:

 Annie Maud Mowbray (died 29 Oct 1926), who married the Rev. Charles Thomas Cruttwell, canon residentiary of Peterborough
 Edith Marian Mowbray (died 27 March 1933), unmarried
 Sir Robert Gray Cornish Mowbray, 2nd Baronet (21 May 1850–23 July 1916)
 Sir Reginald Ambrose Mowbray, 3rd Baronet (5 April 1852–30 December 1916)
 Rev. Sir Edmund George Lionel Mowbray, 4th Baronet (26 June 1859–2 February 1919)

Career
In 1853 Mowbray was elected to the House of Commons for Durham, a seat he held until 1868, and then represented Oxford University from 1868 until his death in 1899. In the House, he was chair of the Committee of Selection and of the Standing Orders Committee. He served as Judge Advocate General under the Earl of Derby from 1858 to 1859, and under Derby and later Benjamin Disraeli from 1866 to 1868. He was admitted to the Privy Council in 1858 and in 1880 he was created a baronet. From 1898 until his death the following year Mowbray was Father of the House of Commons.

A bronze bust was erected as a memorial in the House of Commons in 1900.

Notes

Sources

External links 
Kidd, Charles, Williamson, David (editors). Debrett's Peerage and Baronetage (1990 edition). New York: St Martin's Press, 1990, 
 

1815 births
1899 deaths
Baronets in the Baronetage of the United Kingdom
Members of the Privy Council of the United Kingdom
Members of the Parliament of the United Kingdom for City of Durham
Members of the Parliament of the United Kingdom for the University of Oxford
UK MPs 1852–1857
UK MPs 1857–1859
UK MPs 1859–1865
UK MPs 1865–1868
UK MPs 1868–1874
UK MPs 1874–1880
UK MPs 1880–1885
UK MPs 1885–1886
UK MPs 1886–1892
UK MPs 1892–1895
UK MPs 1895–1900
People educated at Westminster School, London
Alumni of Christ Church, Oxford
Presidents of the Oxford Union
Church Estates Commissioners